General elections were due to be held in Sark on 10 December 2014. However, only 16 candidates nominated for the 16 seats in the Chief Pleas, meaning that all were elected unopposed, without a public vote being required.

On 10 December a draw was carried out to decide which two candidates would serve two-year terms, and which fourteen would serve four-year terms.

Conduct
The Sark Government appointed Howard Knight to serve as an international observer of the elections. Howard commented that the lack of competition raised questions "about the democratic credentials" of the elections.

Results

References

Sark
2014 in Guernsey
Elections in Sark
Uncontested elections
Non-partisan elections
Sark